Lycée Français de Malabo "Le Concorde", previously École Française "Le Concorde", is a French international school in Malabo, Equatorial Guinea. It serves primary school through lycée or bachillerato/instituto (senior high school).

See also

 Education in Equatorial Guinea
 List of international schools

References

External links
  Lycée Francais de Malabo

Educational institutions with year of establishment missing
Buildings and structures in Malabo
Elementary and primary schools in Equatorial Guinea
International high schools
International schools in Equatorial Guinea
Malabo
High schools and secondary schools in Equatorial Guinea